Heteroconis ornata is a species of Australian lacewing that was first described by Günther Enderlein in 1905. The species is found in Queensland and New South Wales. The species was first recorded in New Zealand in 1988, and by the late 1980s a small colony was found to be established in West Auckland.

Gallery

References

Coniopterygidae
Insects described in 1905
Insects of Australia
Insects of New Zealand
Taxa named by Günther Enderlein